Jorge Gomes (born 17 January 1972) is an Angolan swimmer. He competed in the men's 100 metre butterfly at the 1988 Summer Olympics, finishing last, in 51st place.

References

External links
 

1972 births
Living people
Angolan male swimmers
Olympic swimmers of Angola
Swimmers at the 1988 Summer Olympics
Place of birth missing (living people)